The  is a suborganization of the  devoted to the development and promotion of science and research in medicine. The Japanese Association of Medical Sciences was founded independently of the Japan Medical Association in 1902 as a collaboration between 16 medical societies in Japan. Since their founding, they have held a general assembly called the Japan Medical Congress every four years except in 1947 when it was postponed for a year due to the Second World War. In 1948, they held their twelfth assembly at which point they merged with the Japan Medical Association, which has remained their parent organization since. Rather than individuals, the Japanese Association of Medical Sciences has member societies. As of 2019, they have 132 member societies.

Member Societies

Japan Medical Congress
The following are the years and locations of each of the Japan Medical Congresses:

References

External links
 Japanese Association of Medical Sciences (English)

1902 establishments in Japan
Medical Association, Japan
Medical Association, Japan
Scientific organizations established in 1902
Medical associations based in Japan